Isane is a village in Bremanger Municipality in Vestland county, Norway. The population (2001) of Isane is 42. Since 2006, the village has become an important seaport for importing yellowfin tuna.

References

Villages in Vestland
Bremanger